IK Huge Bandy was the bandy team of IK Huge from Gävle, Sweden. They won the 1939 and 1940 Swedish Championships by defeating Nässjö IF with 5–2 at Strömvallen in the 1939 edition and Sandvikens AIK with 2–1 at Stockholm Olympic Stadium in the 1940 edition.

Honours

Domestic
 Swedish Champions:
 Winners (2): 1939, 1940

References

Sport in Gävle
Bandy clubs in Sweden